Deep Water is a psychological thriller novel by Patricia Highsmith, first published in 1957 by Harper & Brothers. It is Highsmith's fifth published novel, the working title originally being The Dog in the Manger. It was brought back into print in the United States in 2003 by W. W. Norton & Company.

Plot
Vic and Melinda Van Allen are a couple in the small town of Little Wesley. Their loveless marriage is held together only by a precarious arrangement whereby, in order to avoid the messiness of divorce, Melinda is allowed to take any number of lovers as long as she does not desert her family. Vic becomes fascinated with the unsolved murder of one of Melinda's former lovers, Malcolm McRae, and, in order to successfully drive away her current fling, takes credit for the killing. When the real murderer is apprehended, Vic's claims are interpreted by the community as dark jokes.

Melinda begins a new relationship with a local pianist, Charley De Lisle. One night, at a party given at the home of one of their neighbours, the Cowans, Vic and Charley find themselves alone in the Cowans' backyard swimming pool. Impulsively, Vic drowns Charley, exits the pool, and feigns surprise when his body is discovered. His death is attributed to a cramp, though Melinda is immediately suspicious of her husband.

Vic and many of his neighbours begin to move on from the event, though some  particularly Don Wilson, a local pulp writer  begin to idly suspect him of foul play. Melinda demands Vic admit his guilt and accuses him in front of their friends, though Vic is undaunted, finding superiority in his successful crime. A new neighbour, Harold Carpenter, appears in town, claiming to be researching psychiatry at a local asylum. Vic deduces that he is really a private detective hired by Don and Melinda. Carpenter leaves town, unable to nail down anything solid against Vic.

Melinda eventually finds a new lover, a surveyor from New York named Tony Cameron. Vic privately offers Melinda a divorce and she finally accepts, saying that Tony has offered to take her to his next assignment in Mexico. Vic runs into Tony in town and offers him a lift; he drives to the local quarry. There, Vic murders him by throwing him off a cliff, then weighs his body and hides it in the water.

An investigation is opened into Tony's sudden disappearance, though many of the neighbours refuse to co-operate due to Vic's good standing and the police's implication that Tony and Melinda were planning to run away together. Vic is again cleared of much suspicion. To his surprise, in the wake of Tony's death, Melinda begins to act more courteously, even loving, toward him, suggesting that she wishes for them to start over again. When she attempts to use this new openness to draw Vic into confessing to the murders of Charley and Tony, Vic suspects it to be a last-ditch ruse concocted by Melinda and Don.

Melinda finally implements a plan to bring Vic and Don to the quarry at the same time, where Don finds blood stains and Vic checks the water to ensure Tony's body has not resurfaced. Vic knows, as the two of them leave, that Don will be going directly to the police. Vic returns home and, in a sudden rage, strangles Melinda to death. At that moment Don arrives with a policeman, and Vic is led away.

Reception
Anthony Boucher reviewing the novel in The New York Times, praised Highsmith's "coming of age as a novelist", and noted that Deep Water was "incomparably stronger in subtlety and depth of characterisation" than her first novel, Strangers on a Train.

Author Gillian Flynn has called the novel one of her favourites. In an interview with The Wall Street Journal, Flynn stated:About ten or fifteen years ago, I came across it in a used-book store. I remember thinking, "Why has no one told me about it?" People know her for Ripley or Strangers on a Train but don't know a lot of her other stuff. And, it being a marital thriller where all the phobias and fears and darkness are based mostly inside a couple's home, that has always interested me, that in-your-face warfare between a husband and wife.

Film adaptation
 The novel was adapted in 1981 by director Michel Deville into the film Eaux profondes, relocating the setting to France. Jean-Louis Trintignant starred as Vic, with Isabelle Huppert as Melinda, renamed Melanie.
 In 1983 the novel was adapted a second time into the television film (in 2 parts) Tiefe Wasser, relocating the setting to Germany. Peter Bongartz starred Vic van Allen, with Constanze Engelbrecht as Melinda.
 Adrian Lyne directed a film adaptation, released in 2022, starring Ben Affleck and Ana de Armas for 20th Century Studios based on a script by Zach Helm and Sam Levinson.

References

External links
 Book of a Lifetime: Deep Water - Appreciation of the novel by Craig Brown, The Independent, Nov. 4, 2011.
 Deep Water (book details) on ChooseYourHighsmith.com
 Deep Water, the Hunt for the 1958 Heinemann First Edition - Existential Ennui, Sept. 26, 2013
 Gillian Flynn on Deep Water - The Wall Street Journal book club selects Deep Water, April 24, 2014

1957 American novels
American novels adapted into films
American novels adapted into television shows
Novels by Patricia Highsmith
Harper & Brothers books